"Soup to nuts" is an American English idiom that conveys the meaning of "from beginning to end", derived from the description of a full course dinner.

Soup to nuts may also refer to:
 Soup to Nuts, a 1930 feature film starring the trio who later became the Three Stooges
 "Soup to Nuts," a 1986 episode of Mama's Family
 "Soup to Nuts" (That's So Raven), an episode of That's So Raven
 Soup2Nuts, a defunct production company known for its animated comedies
 Soup to Nutz, an American comic strip launched in 2000
 NTS Radio, online radio station that uses an abbreviation for Nuts To Soup for its name.

See also
 From Soup to Nuts, a 1928 short comedy film starring Laurel and Hardy
 Duck Soup to Nuts, a 1944 Looney Tunes animated short featuring Porky Pig and Daffy Duck